Sesame chicken is a dish commonly found in Chinese restaurants throughout the United States and Canada. The dish is similar to General Tso's chicken but the taste of the Chinese-based chicken is sweet rather than spicy.

Description

The dish involves chicken (usually thigh) pieces that are de-boned, battered and Chinese deep-fried, then dressed with a translucent, reddish-brown, semi-thick, somewhat sweet sauce made from corn starch, vinegar, wine or sake, chicken broth and sugar, the last of which is a major contributor to sesame chicken's relative sweetness. After these preparations, the unfinished dish is topped with small sesame seeds, which may or may not be toasted, hence the name sesame chicken. It is sometimes, but not always, served with vegetables such as broccoli and baby corn.

Variations
Sesame shrimp is also a popular variation of sesame chicken. Shrimp is simply substituted for chicken. Preparation of this dish is the same, with the exception of the degree and length of heating of the meat. Some restaurants serve sesame tofu.  

Another potential difference is that chopped almonds may be substituted for the sesame seeds, hence the name almond shrimp.

See also
 List of chicken dishes
 List of sesame seed dishes

References

External links
Restaurant-style Chinese Sesame Chicken
Recipe for "Flawless" Chinese Sesame Seed Chicken
Sesame Chicken - Chinese Chicken Recipes
Chinese-style Sesame Chicken Recipe
Best Chinese Sesame Chicken in Alaska

American Chinese chicken dishes
Deep fried foods
Chicken